A. A. Maruf Saklain (1944 - 2017) was a Bangladesh Awami League politician, Bangladesh Army officer, and a former Member of Parliament of Nilphamari-4.

Career
Saklain retired from Bangladesh Army as a colonel and was a member of Retired Armed Forces Officer's Welfare Association. He was elected to parliament from Nilphamari-4 as a Bangladesh Awami League candidate in 2008.

Death
Saklain died on 21 April 2017.

References

1944 births
Awami League politicians
2017 deaths
9th Jatiya Sangsad members